The Universidad Autónoma de Santa Ana is a university in Santa Ana, El Salvador.

References

External links

 Official site 

Universities in El Salvador
Educational institutions established in 1982
Santa Ana, El Salvador
1982 establishments in El Salvador